The Zimbabwean cricket team began touring Pakistan for five One Day Internationals and a four-day tour match on 14 January. Pakistan began the tour after suffering One Day series defeats at the hands of both India and South Africa while Zimbabwe had lost a home series to West Indies prior to their arrival.

Zimbabwe named the same squad that lost 3–1 to the West Indies while Pakistan named uncapped Nasir Jamshed, Samiullah Khan and Kamran Hussain in their squad. Over the course of the series, they called up a number of uncapped and inexperienced players, including Abdur Rauf, Wahab Riaz, and Khurram Manzoor.

Squads

Khalid Latif and Sohail Khan replaced Samiullah Khan and Sarfaraz Ahmed in Pakistan's squad before the 3rd ODI. For the 4th ODI, Khurram Manzoor and Wahab Riaz were included in Pakistan's squad, replacing Salman Butt and Yasir Arafat, while, Iftikhar Anjum and Kamran Akmal were given rest, and Sarfaraz Ahmed replaced Kamran Akmal as wicket-keeper for the remaining two ODIs.Shahid Afridi and Mohammad Yousuf both were rested for the 5th ODI and Rizwan Ahmed, Abdur Rauf, Naumanullah and Junaid Zia all were included in the squad.

Tour match

First-class: Pakistan Cricket Board Patron's XI vs Zimbabweans

ODI series

1st ODI

Pakistan cruised to a facile victory on a batsman-friendly pitch in Karachi as five men, including debutant Nasir Jamshed scored half-centuries. Younus Khan, Mohammad Yousuf, Shoaib Malik and Misbah-ul-Haq were the other four with Younus top scoring with 79 as Pakistan posted a huge 347 for five from their overs. The Zimbabwe run chase got off to a bright start despite the early loss of Hamilton Masakadza as Vusi Sibanda and Chamu Chibhabha also passed fifty, adding 56 runs for the second wicket. Pakistan hit back with regular wickets, spinners Shoaib Malik and Shahid Afridi picking up five before them, slowing the Zimbabweans down and despite a late blast of 52 from Sean Williams, they were untroubled on their way to victory. Nasir was named man of the match for his 48-ball innings of 61 that included six fours and three sixes.

2nd ODI

Pakistan eased into a 2–0 series lead with Nasir Jamshed and Sohail Tanvir playing starring roles in Hyderabad. Batting first, Hamilton Masakadza and Tatenda Taibu, with 81, top scored for Zimbabwe but no other batsman could make a significant contribution, as Tanvir took career-best figures of four for 34, rendering their final score of 238 a modest one, at best. Jamshed, in only his second match, then smashed fifty from 43 balls, before he was eventually run out for 74 to put Zimbabwe on the back foot. They rallied, taking four more wickets, but a circumspect knock of 38 not out from Mohammad Yousuf and a belligerent 43 off 21 balls from Shahid Afridi ensured Pakistan made their target with 22 balls to spare.

3rd ODI

Pakistan were given a scare by Zimbabwe, for whom Tawanda Mupariwa took four top order wickets before Shahid Afridi with a characteristic innings of 85 from 52 balls helped Pakistan blast their way to 272 for nine from their 50 overs. It was by no means a commanding score, and when Sean Williams (71) and Brendan Taylor (55) were batting together, it looked like a shock was on the cards. However, once those two fell within 11 runs of each other, Pakistan regained control of the match and closed out a 37-run win that sealed the series.

4th ODI

A Mohammad Yousuf century helped Pakistan into a 4–0 series lead after Zimbabwe had rallied to post a score of 244 in Faisalabad. Tatenda Taibu hit 51 and Sean Williams 48 before Shoaib Malik had both caught and bowled after they had shared a half-century stand. The innings stuttered before a late blast of 45 from 33 balls from Keith Dabengwa saw them get to their score of 244, bowled out in the final over. Pakistan lost their openers relatively quickly before a stand of 141 between Yousuf and Malik, who was run out for 88, ended any hopes Zimbabwe had of winning the game. Yousuf ended unbeaten on 108 not out with Malik awarded the man of the match having already taken three for 55.

5th ODI

Pakistan cruised to a 5–0 series clean sweep with debutants Abdur Rauf, Wahab Riaz and Khurram Manzoor playing starring roles. Brendan Taylor hit 50 for Zimbabwe, who won the toss and chose to bat, but they were undone by five wickets by Rauf and Riaz with captain Shoaib Malik chipping in with two, one of which Taylor immediately after he had reached a half-century. Zimbabwe were bowled out for a modest 183 in the 46th over. Nasir Jamshed fell early, but 50 runs on his debut from Manzoor and 63 from Younis Khan ensured Pakistan had no problem reaching their target, which they eventually did after 31 overs with Misbah-ul-Haq hitting a six to win the game.

References

External links
 Series home at ESPN

2008 in Pakistani cricket
2008 in Zimbabwean cricket
International cricket competitions in 2007–08
Pakistani cricket seasons from 2000–01
2007–08